Mükerrem or Mukerrem is a Turkish given name. Notable people with the name include:

 Mükerrem Hiç (1929–2012), Turkish professor of economics and political economy
 Mükerrem Kamil Su (1906–1984), Turkish writer
 Mükerrem Selen Soyder (born 1986), Turkish model known professionally as Selen Soyder

Turkish feminine given names
Turkish masculine given names